Fewings is a surname. Notable people with the surname include:

Eliza Ann Fewings (1857–1940), English teacher
James Fewings (1849–1920), British cricketer
Jo Stone-Fewings (born 1967), British actor
Paul Fewings (born 1978), British footballer